Norm or Norman Cox may refer to:

Norm Cox (American football) (1925–2008), American football player
Norm Cox (designer) (born 1951), American designer
Norman Cox (rugby union), see List of England national rugby union players
Norman Kershaw Cox (1869–1949), New Zealand dentist